Peter Hempel (born 30 April 1959) is an East German sprint canoer.

Sports career
Hempel competed from the late 1970s to the mid-1980s. He won nine medals at the ICF Canoe Sprint World Championships with three golds (K-4 500 m: 1983, 1985; K-4 1000 m: 1981), three silvers (K-1 500 m: 1982, K-4 1000 m: 1982, 1983), and three bronzes (K-1 500 m: 1978, 1979; K-4 1000 m: 1985).

Hempel also finished fifth in the K-2 1000 m event at the 1980 Summer Olympics in Moscow.

References

External links
 
 

1959 births
Living people
German male canoeists
ICF Canoe Sprint World Championships medalists in kayak
Olympic canoeists of East Germany
Canoeists at the 1980 Summer Olympics